The Medicare for All Act, aka the Expanded and Improved Medicare for All Act or United States National Health Care Act, is a bill first introduced in the United States House of Representatives by Representative John Conyers (D-MI) in 2003, with 38 co-sponsors. In 2019, the original 16-year-old proposal was renumbered, and Pramila Jayapal (D-WA) introduced a broadly similar, but more detailed, bill, HR 1384, in the 116th Congress. , it had 116 co-sponsors still in the House at the time, or 49.8% of House Democrats.

The act would establish a universal single-payer national health insurance system in the United States, the rough equivalent of Canada's Medicare and Taiwan's Bureau of National Health Insurance, among other examples. Under a single-payer system, most medical care would be paid for by the federal government, ending the need for private health insurance and premiums, and re-casting private insurance companies as providing purely supplemental coverage, to be used when non-essential care is sought. The national system would be paid for in part through taxes replacing insurance premiums, but also by savings realized through the provision of preventive universal health care and the elimination of insurance company overhead and hospital billing costs.

On September 13, 2017, Senator Bernie Sanders (I-VT) introduced a parallel bill in the United States Senate, with 16 co-sponsors. The act would establish a universal single-payer health care system in the United States.

Provisions
The laws proposed are not necessarily identical year-over-year.

John Conyers' bill 
The summary of the National Health Care Act as proposed in the 111th Congress (2009–2010) includes the following elements, among others:

 Expands the Medicare program to provide all individuals residing in the 50 states, Washington, D.C., Puerto Rico, and territories of the United States with tax-funded health care that includes all medically necessary care. That would include primary and preventive care, prescription drugs, emergency care, long-term care, mental health services, dental services, and vision care.
 Prohibits an institution from participating unless it is a public or nonprofit institution. Allows nonprofit health maintenance organizations (HMOs) that deliver care in their own facilities to participate. On the whole, private insurance would be replaced with the new nationalized system for all basic, major care.
 Gives patients the freedom to choose from participating physicians and institutions, which, given the coverage of the new national system, would be any institution or clinic in the United States receiving any degree of public funding (the vast majority).
 Prohibits a private health insurer from selling health insurance coverage that duplicates the benefits provided under this Act. Allows the private insurers to sell benefits not medically necessary, such as cosmetic surgery benefits.
 Sets forth methods to pay institutional providers of care and health professionals for services. Prohibits financial incentives between HMOs and physicians based on utilization.
 Establishes the USNHC Trust Fund to finance the Program with amounts deposited: (1) from existing sources of government revenues for health care; (2) by increasing personal income taxes on the top 5% of income earners; (3) by instituting a progressive excise tax on payroll and self-employment income; and (4) by instituting a small tax on stock and bond transactions. Transfers and appropriates amounts that would have been appropriated for federal public health care programs, including Medicare, Medicaid, and the State Children's Health Insurance Program. Taxes would be paid instead of insurance premiums, as the government (instead of private insurance companies) would be paying for the care under the single-payer health care.
 Establishes a program to assist individuals whose jobs are eliminated (such as within insurance companies) by the simplified single-payer administrative process.
 Requires creation of a confidential electronic patient record system.
 Establishes a National Board of Universal Quality and Access to provide advice on quality, access, and affordability.
 Provides for the eventual integration of the Indian Health Service into the Program and evaluation of the continued independence of Department of Veterans Affairs (VA) health programs.
 The bill covers treatments starting on the first day of the year that follows one year after the date of passage.
 Compensation continues for 15 years to owners of converting for-profit providers for reasonable financial losses.

Pramila Jayapal's bill 
Pramila Jayapal's Medicare for All Act of 2019, introduced in the House is broadly similar but more detailed than the original Conyers proposal, but the "parallel" proposal by Sanders has significant differences, including a "global budget" system for hospitals. Both proposals contain expansive coverage including long-term care and dental care with no cost-sharing such as coinsurance, deductibles, or premiums, which as of 2019 is unprecedented in the world.

Under the House version, funding for institutions such as hospitals would be negotiated with regional directors, while individual providers would be paid a fee-for-service. Value-based pay for performance incentives would not be allowed. HHS would have administrative authority to set various details.

The Senate proposal sets out a four-year transition plan and the House proposal is two years.

As of April 2019, the Senate proposal did not include details on how to completely pay for the plan, but Sanders had released a paper listing ideas.

Legislative history 
:

Analysis
An analysis of the bill by Physicians for a National Health Program estimated the immediate savings at $350 billion per year. Others have estimated a long-term savings amounting to 40% of all national health expenditures due to the extended preventive healthcare and the elimination of insurance company overhead costs.

A study estimated the 1999 costs of U.S. health care administration at nearly $300 billion, accounting for 30.1% of health care expenses, versus 16.7% in Canada. This study estimated the U.S. per-person administrative cost at $1,059.

Charles Blahouse, who worked as George W. Bush's economic advisor and as a public trustee for medicare and social security, wrote a Mercatus Center study of the 2017 proposal It claims that Sanders' M4A plan will increase federal spending by at least $32 trillion (this money is currently going to private healthcare) but that the savings on administrative and other costs could save $2 trillion in healthcare costs. However, Blahouse stresses that these savings rely on multiple generous assumptions and that the plan will likely cost significantly more.

A 2019 analysis was critical of Sanders bill for allowing accountable care organizations and failing to include a provision to negotiate budgets with hospitals.

According to a 2020 study in The Lancet, the Medicare for All Act was estimated to save 13% in national health-care expenditure (equivalent to more than US$450 billion annually), and save more than 68,500 lives every year.

See also

 Health care reform
 Health care reform in the United States
 Healthcare-NOW!
 Healthy Americans Act
 Healthcare rationing in the United States
 Medicare (United States)
 Public health insurance option

Other countries
 Canadian and American health care systems compared
 Health systems by country

References

External links
 PNHP.org—Physicians for a National Health Program
 Healthcare-now.org—Healthcare-NOW!
 SinglePayerNow.net—Single Payer Now!
 MedicareForAll.org—"Single-payer for the USA".

Proposed legislation of the 108th United States Congress
Proposed legislation of the 109th United States Congress
Proposed legislation of the 110th United States Congress
Proposed legislation of the 111th United States Congress
Proposed legislation of the 112th United States Congress
Proposed legislation of the 113th United States Congress
Proposed legislation of the 114th United States Congress
Proposed legislation of the 115th United States Congress
Proposed legislation of the 116th United States Congress
Proposed legislation of the 117th United States Congress
Healthcare reform legislation in the United States
Medicare and Medicaid (United States)
National Health Care Act